Gliophorus graminicolor is a species of agaric fungus in the family Hygrophoraceae. It is found in Australia and New Zealand. In 1995, Australian mycologists Tom May and Alec Wood transferred the species to Hygrocybe, but the taxonomic authority Index Fungorum retains it in Gliophorus.

References

External links

Hygrophoraceae
Fungi described in 1973
Fungi of Australia
Fungi of New Zealand
Taxa named by Egon Horak